This is a list of identity document policies by country.

A national identity document is an identity card with a photo, usable as an identity card at least inside the country, and which is issued by an official authority.

Driver's licenses and other cards issued by regional governments indicating certain permissions are not counted here as national identity cards. So for example, by this criterion, the United States driver's license is excluded, as these are issued by local (state) governments.

Identity card policies by country

Countries with compulsory identity cards
According to a 1996 publication by Privacy International, around 100 countries had enacted laws making identity cards compulsory. In these countries, the card must be shown on demand by authorised personnel under specified circumstances. In some countries alternative proof of identity, such as a driving licence is acceptable. Privacy International said that "virtually no common law country has a card". One noticeable exception is Hong Kong (a common law jurisdiction).

The term "compulsory" may have different meanings and implications in different countries.  of a card may only become compulsory at a certain age. There may be a penalty for not  a card or similar official identification such as a passport. In some cases a person may be detained until identity is proven. This facilitates police identification of fugitives. In some countries, police need a reason, such as suspicion of a crime or security risk. In other countries, police can ask for official identification without stating a reason. Random checks are rare, except in police states. Normally there is an age limit, such as 18, after which possession is mandatory, even if minors aged 15–17 may need a card in order to prove that they are under 18.

In the European Union, a citizen's national identity card, if it complies with certain technical standards and states citizenship, can in most cases be used to travel (within the EU) in lieu of a passport.

{| class="wikitable"
! Country
! width=200px|Name
! Description
|-
| 
| Tazkira(Afghan identity card)
| The Tazkira is an electronic ID card issued to a citizen of Afghanistan.
|-
| 
| Letërnjoftimi(Albanian Identity Card)
| The Letërnjoftimi is an electronic biometric ID card, compulsory upon 16 years old and costs 1200 lekë (€10).
|-
| 
| بطاقة الهوية الوطنية/ Carte nationale d’identité (Algerian National Identity card)
| The Algerian national identity card is an electronic biometric ID card, compulsory for all Algerian nationals and costs 2500 Algerian Dinar.
|-
| 
| Bilhete de identidade de cidadão nacional (national citizen identity card)
| The Angolan national identity is compulsory. It contains the person's name, date of birth, date and place of issue, validity, filiation, photo, marital status, fingerprint of the citizen's right indicator, a signature and address. Nevertheless, more than 12 million Angolans do not possess a national identity card.
|-
| 
| Electoral National Identification card
| The Antiguan and Barbudan national identity card is compulsory for voting as well as for different government transactions. 
|-
| 
| Documento Nacional de Identidad (DNI)(National Identity Card)
| The Documento Nacional de Identidad (DNI) is issued at a person's birth, and updated at 8 and 14 years of age, and thereafter renewed every fifteen years. For many years, the DNI was issued as a small booklet (libreta). In 2009, the DNI was revamped and digitalized; and booklets were issued along with a card (tarjeta) simultaneously. Since 2012, DNIs are issued only in card format, and starting in 2015, they'll have a chip with information of the holder and NFC payment. The new DNI card is required to obtain a new Argentine Passport and there are penalties if they aren't renewed in time.
|-
| 
| Şəxsiyyət vəsiqəsi(Azerbaijan Identity Card)
| The Şəxsiyyət vəsiqəsi is an ID card, compulsory upon 16 years old and costs 5 manats (€2,5). It is not compulsory to carry it at all time.
|-
|
|Central Popular Registration (CPR)
|Central Population Register (CPR) is a nine digit (all numeric) identification number which is also called as personal number issued for all the residents living in Bahrain. In order to avail basic or any services, carry out financial transactions one must have CPR.
|-
| 
|National identity card (NID-Card)জাতীয় পরিচয়পত্র
|"National Identity" (NID) card is a compulsory electronic biometric identification for all citizens at the age of 18 and above. All Bangladeshis are issued with an NID Card which is mandatory to obtain a Passport, Driving Licence, credit card, and to register land ownership, SIM Card, various allowance provided through Social Welfare Division of Bangladeshi Government etc. Moreover, Each citizen of Bangladesh is directed to have "Birth Registration Certificate" (BRC) immediately after birth. BRC is mandatory for obtaining NID and usually protect the identity of minors who are not eligible for NID due to age restriction.
|-
| 
| Нацыянальная ідэнтыфікацыйная карта (Belarus national identity card (since 2021))
| Belarus has combined the international passport and the internal passport into one document. It follows the international passport convention but has extra pages for domestic use. The Belarusian passport is compulsory at 14. Reissued every 10 years. Could be issued before 14 for travelling purposes. New biometric identity cards were planned to be rolled out in 2018, only to be postponed three times.
|-
| 
| Identiteitskaart / Carte d’Identité / Personalausweis (Identity Card)
| The card is first issued at age 12, compulsory by 15. Since the beginning of 2005 the eID (electronic IDentity card) has been issued to Belgian citizens who apply for a new identity card. Apart from being a form of identification, the card also is used for authentication purposes. Future usages include using the eID as a library card, keycard for restricted areas or chatrooms and the digital signing of documents. It is expected that in 2009 all Belgians will have an eID card. They have to be carried at all times.
|-
| 
| Carte nationale d'identité (National identity card)
| Compulsory. Biometric since 2016.
|-
| 
| Bhutan citizenship card
| The Bhutanese national identity card is an electronic ID card, compulsory for all Bhutanese nationals and costs 100 Bhutanese ngultrum.
|-
| 
| Cédula de Identidad (Identity Card)
| Compulsory at 18, but rarely required by police.
|-
| 
| Omang (National Identity Card)
| It is compulsory for all citizens at age 16, and there are penalties for not obtaining it within one month of turning 16 or obtaining citizenship, whichever comes last. Includes the image of the individual (no headgear or eyewear), their particulars, and their right thumbprint. Valid for 10 years, whereupon it must be renewed and a new photograph taken. Must be presented upon request by any agent of the state, and the state requires all non-state institutions to use the national ID card as the only acceptable means of identification for citizens - passports and driver's licences should not be used, even though they contain most of the information on the ID card, including the ID card number. There are penalties for being issued a replacement card when it has been lost, however, if it is changed to update information on it only the application fee must be paid (e.g., upon expiry, and legal name changes as when a woman gets married and assumes her husband's surname). Every time a new one is issued for whatever reason, a new photograph must be taken. The individual keeps their national ID card number for life, and in recent years it has been linked to the birth certificate number of newborn infants (it is the same number). The national ID card must be surrendered to the government upon the demise of the individual, at which time it will be exchanged for an official death certificate.
|-
| 
| Lična Karta / Osobna iskaznica (Identity Card)
| Compulsory at 16 and is to be carried at all times after turning 18.
|-
| 
| Cédula de Identidade (Identity Card)
| Compulsory to be issued since the age of 18 (though it can be substituted by a series of equivalent documents, see below). It is usually issued, for civilians, by the secretariat of public security of each unit of the federation, but other – including the Armed Forces, the Police and some professional councils – can issue alternate identity cards, too. All must meet certain specifications – they are all coloured green – but each unit of the federation can include minor differences such as the numbering scheme, font, printed seal, and background pattern.
The card's front has the bearer's picture (with an electronic stamp on it) and right thumb print. It also includes either the bearer's signature or – if the bearer is illiterate – the phrase "cannot sign" (não assina) The verso has the unique number assigned the bearer (registro geral or RG), the bearer's full name, filiation, birthplace (locality and federation unit), birth date, and CPF number. It may include some additional information. It is officially 102 × 68 mm, but lamination tends to make it slightly larger than the ISO/IEC 7810 ID-2 standard of 105 × 74 mm, so it is a tight fit in most wallets. A driver's licence has only recently been given the same legal status as the national identity card. In most situations, only a few other documents can be substituted for a national identity card: for example, identification documents issued by national councils of professionals.
|-
| 
| Kad Pengenalan (National Identity Card)
| Compulsory for all citizens at the age of 12.
|-
| 
| Лична карта (Identity Card)
| First issued and is compulsory after turning the age of 14. The new Bulgarian ID cards were introduced in 1999. They follow the general pattern in the EU and replaced the old, Soviet-style "internal passports", also known as "green passports". Since 2007, the Bulgarian identity card can be used to travel within the European Union.
|-
| 
| Carte d'Identité Nationale Burkinabè (CNIB) [Burkinabé National Identity Card]
| National Identity Card compulsory at the age of 15 and valid for 10 years.
|-
| 
| Carte Nationale d'Identité (CNI) [National Identity Card]
| National Identity Card compulsory. Valid for international travel within the East African Community.
|-
| 
| Khmer Identity Card
| Compulsory and biometric since 2011.
|-
| 
| Carte nationale d'identité / national identity card
| Optional, although compulsory for voting, acquisition of both passports and driving licenses and for certain government transactions. 
|-
| 
| Cartão Nacional de Identificação (CNI) [National Identity Card]
| The Cape Verdian national identity card (referred as “Citizen card”) is an electronic biometric ID card, compulsory for all Cape Verdian nationals. The card format is identical to the Portuguese Citizen card, with information displayed in Portuguese, English and French and is made by the same company, also in Portugal. New biometric identity cards are being issued since 2018, replacing the format paper (similar to the old Portuguese identity card) which was issued since 1957.
|-
| 
| Carte nationale d'identité (National identity card)
| Compulsory.
|-
| 
| Carte nationale d'identité (National Identity Card)
| Compulsory with a price of 10.000 CFA.
|-
| 
| Cédula de Identidad (Identity card)
| Normally this is first issued at age 2 or 3, but it can be issued whenever the legal ascendant(s) request its issue. It is compulsory at 18, when it has to be carried at all times.
|-
| 
| Resident Identity Card (居民身份证)
| Normally this is first issued at school age, but it can be issued whenever the legal ascendant(s) request its issue.
|-
| 
| Documento de Identidad / Cédula de Ciudadanía (Identity document)
| Registro Civil de Nacimiento (Birth record) issued when the legal ascendant(s) register the newborn. Tarjeta de identidad is issued at age of 7. From 26 June 2013, is available the new format (coloured sky blue) with biometric features. The previous format (coloured pink) is still valid until the minor reaches 14, when he or she has to request the new sky blue format.  Cédula de Ciudadanía is compulsory at the age of 18, and from 31 July 2010, the only valid format is the yellow one. It has to be carried at all times and must be presented to police or the military upon their request.
At end of 2020, a new Electronic Identity Document is being issued with had to be renewed every 10 years, it allows to carry a physical card and also available through a mobile application 
|-
| 
| Carte nationale d’identité (Comoros national identity card)
| The Comorian national identity card is an ID card, compulsory for all Comorian nationals. Biometric since January 2018.
|-
| 
| Carte nationale d'identité (national identity card)
| Compulsory at the age of 18.
|-
| 
| Cédula de identidad (Costa Rica)
| Every citizen immediately must carry an ID card after turning 18.
|-
| 
| Osobna iskaznica (Personal card)
| The Croatian identity card is compulsory for citizens of Croatia who have a permanent residence in Croatia and are at least 18 years old. By law, it must to be carried at all times.
|-
| 
| Carnet de identidad (Identity card)
| Compulsory for anyone 16 and older and must be carried at all times. It is routinely used for identification and is often necessary to conduct public and private business. 
|-
| 
| Greek: Δελτίο ΤαυτότηταςTurkish: Kimlik Kartı (Identity card)
| Compulsory at 12. 
|-
| 
| Občanský průkaz (Civil card)
| Compulsory at 15 for those with a permanent stay registered in the country.
|-
| 
| Carte nationale d'identité/ بطاقة الهوية الوطنية (national identity card)
| Compulsory for all Djiboutians. Electronic since 2014.
|-
| 
| Cédula de Identidad y Electoral (CIE)(Personality Verification Card)
| If needed, an underage ID card may be obtained at the age of 16, yet the official ID (which will allow the individual to vote) is obtained at 18.
|-
| 
| بطاقة تحقيق الشخصية (Personality Verification Card)
| The Personality Verification Card is compulsory at the age of 16. Issued by the Civil Registry Office which is subordinate to the Ministry of Interior. Not carrying the ID card is only penalised by fine not exceeding £E200.
|-
| 
| Documento Único de Identidad (Unique Identity Document)
| Every citizen 18 years or older must carry this ID card.
|-
| 
| Cédula de Identidad (National identity card)
| Every citizen over 18 years must have a national identity card. The renewal of the card is $10.00.
|-
| 
| Documento de Identidad Personal (Personal Identity Document)
| Compulsory to all citizens.
|-
| 
| ሃገራዊ ናይ መንነት ወረቀት (National identity card)
| Compulsory for all Eritrean citizens. New version rolled out in 2014.
|-
| 
| Isikutunnistus (Identity card)
| Compulsory by law, but there is no penalty for not having one. Many electronic services are available (legally binding digital signatures, internet banking, internet voting, strong authentication to government and private websites). Citizens carrying ID cards are not required to carry drivers licence and registration.
|-
| 
| ብሄራዊ መታወቂያ ካርድ (National Identity Card)
| Compulsory to all Ethiopian citizens.
|-
| 
| Carte Nationale d'identité (National Identity card)
| Compulsory.
|-
| 
| Gambian National Identity Card
| All Gambian citizens 18 years or older are required to hold a Gambian National ID Card.
|-
| 
| ეროვნული პირადობის მოწმობა (National identity card)
| Compulsory for Georgian citizens after turning 14 (within 6 months). Valid for international travel to Turkey.
|-
| 
| Personalausweis (Identity Card)
| Compulsory for all German citizens aged 16 or older to possess either a "Personalausweis" (identity card) or a passport, but not to carry it. While police officers and some other officials have a right to demand to see one of those documents, the law does not state that one is obliged to submit the document immediately. Fines may only be applied if an identity card or passport is not possessed at all, if the document is expired or if one explicitly refuses to show ID to the police. If one is unable to produce an ID card or passport (or any other form of credible identification) during a police control, one can (in theory) be brought to the next police post and detained for a maximum of 12 hours, or until positive identification is possible. However, this measure is only applied if the police have reasonable grounds to believe the person detained has committed an offence.
As driving licences are not legally accepted forms of identification in Germany, most persons carry their "Personalausweis" with them. more
|-
| 
| Ghana Card
| Compulsory for Ghanaian citizens above 16.
|-
| 
| Αστυνομική Ταυτότητα (Police Identity Card)
| In Greece, the biggest change in Identity Documents Law happened in 2000, when some fields of the Police Identity Card (as Greeks call it) were rejected. These fields included religion, addresses, biometric characteristics and fingerprint. Oppositely, some fields were added. These are Latin transliterations of name and surname, blood type and Rhesus of the owner. Under this law, all Greeks over 12 years old must have an Identity Card issued.
In Greece, there are many everyday things you cannot do without an ID. In fact, according to an older law, the Police ID is the only legal identity document and no one has a right to ask for more identity documents. Since the 1980s all legal services in Greece must be done with this ID. Also, you can travel within the EU with a Greek national ID card, but it is not advisable since travelling with ID without machine readable zone often causes delay at border controls. Carrying the ID is not de jure compulsory. However, during routine police checks, if a citizen is found without an ID, the police officer may take them to the nearest police station for further investigation, thus rendering always carrying the ID card de facto compulsory.
|-
| 
| Documento Personal de Identificación (National Identity Document)
| Identity cards are issued to any Guatemalan and legal residents. For children between 0 and 12 years the document is golden shaded; between 13 and 17 years the document is silvered. Documents for Guatemalan citizens are blue and for legal residents are red.
Guatemalan constitution requires personal identification via documentation, person rooting or the government. If the person cannot be identified may be sent to a judge until identification is provided.
|-
| 
| Carte nationale d'identité (National identity card)
| Compulsory with a price of 100.000/150.000 CFA.
|-
| 
| Bilhete de identidade CEDEAO (CEDEAO national identity card)
| Biometric since 2018, with a price of 10,000 CFA.
|-
| 
| Guyana national identity card
| The Guyanese national identity card is an electronic ID card, compulsory for all Guyanese nationals.
|-
| 
| Kat idantifikasyon nasyonal / Carte d'identification nationale (National identification card)
| The Haitian national identity card is an electronic ID card, compulsory for all Haitian nationals at the age of 18.
|-
| 
| Cédula de identidad (national identity card)
| The Honduran national identity card is an electronic ID card, compulsory for all Honduran nationals at the age of 18.
|-
| 
| Hong Kong Identity Card (HKID)
| Identity cards have been used since 1949, and been compulsory since 1980. Children are required to obtain their first identity card at age 11, and must change to an adult identity card at age 18. 
Police officers have an absolute right to require every person aged 15 or above on public premises to produce their HKID or valid passport for inspection; failure to produce such photo ID constitutes an offence in law. The reason for setting up police random checks is due to the end of Touch Base Policy on 24 October 1980, which all illegal immigrants from China that failed to present valid Hong Kong Identity Card at random checks will be immediately sent back to Mainland China.
|-
| 
| Személyi igazolvány (Identity card)
| See (in Hungarian) It is compulsory to possess an ID or passport from the age of 14. A driving license can be also used for identification from the age of 17. Private entities however, are legally required to accept passport or driver's licence for proof, but often do not accept them, only the ID card, thus in effect almost all citizens have the ID card.
Police has the legal power to stop people on streets at random and ask for ID card. If the person has no proof for identification one can be detained for maximum 24 hours.
|-
| 
| [[Indian identity card|Aadhaar']] (Identity card)
| Proof of identity such as a passport, Aadhaar, ration card, PAN card, or driving licence is mandatory for issuing essentials such as electricity, water, mobile phone SIM cards, etc. Those without proof of identity can often not obtain such basics. The Supreme Court of India in 2018 ruled that although the UIDAI (Unique Identification Development Authority of India) Act is constitutionally valid, the possession of Aadhar cannot be made a prerequisite for services like opening and operation of bank accounts, admissions in educational institutions or availing of mobile connections. However it remains mandatory for obtaining PAN cards (including continuance of the validity thereof) and filing of tax returns.
|-
| 
| Kartu Tanda Penduduk - KTP (Resident Identification Card)
| The card is issued to Indonesian citizens and foreign nationals with permanent residence in the Republic of Indonesia. Possession of KTP is compulsory for residents whose age is 17 or older, and residents who is married before the age of 17. The electronic version (e-KTP) is valid indefinitely, unless the data recorded on the card has changed (e.g. address, marital status, etc.).
|-
| 
| کارت شناسائی ملی (National Identity card)
| The Iranian national identity card is compulsory for citizens and permanent residents, aged 15 and over.
|-
| 
| Iraq National Card| The National Card is an electronic biometric ID card, compulsory for all Iraqi citizens starting in 2016 and costs 5,000 dinars.
|-
| 
| Teudat Zehut (Hebrew) (Arabic)
| The Teudat Zehut is first issued at age 16 and is compulsory by 18.
|-
| 
| Carte Nationale d'Identité (CNI) National Identity Card
| Compulsory at the age of 15.
|-
| 
| بطاقة شخصية (Personal card)
| First issued at age 16 and is compulsory by 18.
|-
| 
| Jeke qwälik (Identity card)
| The identity cards have been issued since 1994 and compulsory for all citizens at age 16. Biometric since 2009.
|-
| 
| Kitambulisho| All citizens (and permanent residents) are issued a national identification card at age 18. ID cards are the most common forms of identification, although passports can also be used interchangeably in most instances. As of Autumn 2019 there is a new National Integrated Identity Management System (NIIMS) – better known as Huduma Namba, which has caused controversy.
|-
| ||Identity card|| Mandatory national identity card was decided in Kiribati in 2018 and introduced soon after.National Identity Registration bill Age limit is 18.
|-
| 
| Letërnjoftim / Лична карта (National identity card)
| Biometric national ID cards compulsory to all Kosovar citizens.
|-
| 
| بطاقة المدنية (Loosely translated to civil card)| All residents of Kuwait must have a Civil ID card. The legal ascendant(s) of newborns should apply for registration of the child within 60 days after birth. An expatriate must apply for a civil ID card within 30 days of getting his residency.
|-
| 
| Инсандык карта (National identity card)
|Compulsory at 16. Biometric since 2018.
|-
| 
|ບັດປະຈຳຕົວ (identity card)
| There is a compulsory identity document issued in Laos. The document is issued by the police on behalf of the Ministry of Home Affairs and is the main form of identification on the territory of the Lao P.D.R. All Laotian are obliged by law to carry their identity cards with them at all times and are subject to fines should they not, all Laotian nationals must hold the new magnetic Identification Card. Biometric. Distribution of national ID cards started in 2015 and the card is compulsory for all national citizens aged 16 and above. 
|-
| 
| Personas apliecība (identity card)
| An identity card or passport is the mandatory personal identification document for a citizen of Latvia or a non-citizen who lives in Latvia and has reached 18.
|-
| 
| بطاقة هوية Lebanese identity card
| There is a compulsory identity document issued in Lebanon. The document is issued by the police on behalf of the Ministry of Interior and is the main form of identification on the territory of the Republic of Lebanon. All Lebanese are obliged by law to carry their identity cards with them at all times and are subject to fines should they not. , all Lebanese nationals must hold the new magnetic Identification Card.
|-
| 
| National ID card
| Compulsory for all national citizens. ID cards were implemented in 2013.
|-
| 
| National identification card
| New biometric national identity card have been rolled out in the late 2017.
|-
| 
| Carte nationale d'identité / Personalausweis / National Identitéitskaart (National identity card) 
| First issued at age 15 and only issued to Luxembourg citizens, who are required by law to carry it at all times.
|-
| 
| Bilhete de Identidade de Residente (Resident Identity Card)
| It is compulsory for all Macau residents at the age of 5.
|-
| 
| Kara-panondrom-pirenena / Carte nationale d'identité de citoyen malagasy
| Possession is compulsory for Malagasy citizens from age 18 (by decree 78-277 (3 Oct 1978)).
|-
| 
| MyKad
| Issued at age 12, and updated at 18. MyPR for Permanent Resident. MyKas for temporary residents. Non-compulsory MyKid before age of 12. MyKad and MyPR must be carried at all times. Cards are differentiated by colour. MyKad is blue, MyPr is red and MyKas is green.
|-
| 
| National Identification card (Chipaso cha Nzika)
| Biometric. Distribution of national ID cards started in 2017 and the card is compulsory for all national citizens aged 16 and above. 
|-
| 
| Passport Card
| New biometric credit-sized passport cards replaced both driving licenses, health insurance cards and certain types of credit cards. They are compulsory for acquiring a passport book.
|-
| 
| Carte nationale d'identité NINA (NINA National identity card)
| Compulsory to all Malian citizens.
|-
| 
| Karta tal-Identità / Identity card
| Issued at 14, updated at 16, compulsory at 18.
|-
| 
| بطاقة الهوية الوطنية / Carte nationale d’identité (National Identity card)
| Compulsory at 15. Biometric since 2013, with information displayed in Arabic, French and English
|-
| 
| National Identity Card
| Every Mauritian citizen who has reached 18 years old has to apply for a National ID card, which is one of the few accepted forms of identification, including a passport. 
|-
| 
| Buletin de identitate (Identity card)
| Compulsory at 16.
|-
| 
| البطاقة الوطنية للتعريف الإلكترونية / Carte nationale d'identité électronique (CNIE) / National electronic identity card
| The national electronic identity card is the ID of the citizens of Morocco (in Arabic : البطاقة الوطنية للتعريف الإلكترونية). This is an official document which allows any citizen to prove his identity and therefore it is valid, his Moroccan nationality. It is compulsory for all citizens aged over 16 years, but it can be obtained at all ages. The 2008 version of the card is the first to have the form of a credit card. The replacement of the 2008 version for the new 2020 version is not compulsory.
The Directorate General of National Security of Morocco announced it will issue a newer version of the national electronic identity card (NEIC) from 2020. The NEIC is biometric and provides citizens of a birth certificate, residence certificate, extract of birth and citizenship certificates.
|-
| 
| Monégasque identity card
| Compulsory for all Monégasque citizens.
|-
| 
| Монгол Улсын иргэний үнэмлэхийн хуудас (Citizen Identity Card of Mongolia) 
| The national identity card is compulsory for all Mongol citizens. Electronic since 2012, with informations displayed both in Mongol and English.
|-
| 
| Lična karta (Лична карта, Identity card)
| Compulsory at the age of 16, but can be issued at 14 and has to be carried at all times after turning 18. It is issued only to Montenegrin citizens with permanent residence in Montenegro. While it is the most often used official identification document, three other hold the same status — Passport, Driver's licence and Refugee ID card. Old style IDs, that refer to the no longer existing states of SFR Yugoslavia or FR Yugoslavia, are not valid since 2011.
|-
| 
| Bilhete de identidade (Identity card)
| N/A
|-
| 
| National Registration Card (Identity Card)
| Myanmar citizens are required to have a National Registration Card (NRC), while non-citizens are given a Foreign Registration Card.
|-
| 
| National ID card
| Compulsory for all Namibia citizens. New identity cards replaced previous “SWA” IDs in 2016.
|-
| 
| राष्ट्रिय पहिचान कार्ड National Identity Card
| New biometric cards rolled out in 2018. Information displayed in both English and Nepali.
|-
| 
| Carte nationale d'identité (National identity card)
| Compulsory.
|-
| 
| National identity card
| Compulsory. Electronic since 2013.
|-
| 
| "Identity Card", "Travel Pass" (with specified destination of travel and written permission)
| Photos 
North Korea is probably the country which imposes the strongest fines for citizens not carrying ID cards. To travel North Koreans need not only an identity card, but also a "travel pass", with specified destination and written permission. Sometimes citizens may be punished with time in a labour camp for not carrying their cards, however this is often only a short sentence and people are usually released upon presentation of the card at a later date. Although much is not known about the properties of the card, it is probably plastic and similar in size to most European ID cards.
Between 2004 and 2008, all records were transferred to an electronic Korean-language central database. Obtaining a driving license in North Korea is not usual – except in the case of professional drivers, mechanics, and assistants – since few citizens own cars. Only government officials are issued passports because the state restricts citizens travel. North Koreans working abroad are issued contracts between North Korea and the host country to allow for travel, and government officers often accompany and supervise workers.
|-
| 
| Лична карта (Identity card)
| Issued by the ministry of interior to citizens with permanent residence in North Macedonia. It is compulsory at the age of 18.
|-
| 
| بطاقة الهوية الوطنية (Identity Card)
| Compulsory for citizens turning 15. Biometric since 2014 with information displayed in both Arabic and English.
|-
| 
| Cedula de Identidad (National identity card)
| Cedula de Identidad. Required at 12 (cedula juvenil) and 18 years of age. Panamanian citizens must carry their Cedula at all times. New biometric national identity cards rolling out in 2019. The card must be renewed every 10 years (every 5 years for those under 18) and it can only be replaced 3 times (with each replacement costing more than the previous one) without requiring a background check, to confirm and verify that the card holder is not selling his or her identity to third parties for human trafficking or other criminal activities. All cards have QR, PDF417, and Code 128 barcodes. The QR Code holds all printed (on the front of the card) text information about the card holder, while the PDF417 barcode holds, in JPEG format encoded with Base64, an image of the fingerprint of the left index finger of the card holder. Panamanian biometric/electronic/machine readable ID cards are similar to biometric passports and current European/Czech national ID cards and have only a small PDF417 barcode, with a machine readable area, a contactless smart card RFID chip and golden contact pads similar to those found in smart card credit cards and SIM cards. The machine readable code contains all printed text information about the card holder (it replaces the QR Code) while both chips (the smart card chip is hidden under the golden contact pads) contain all personal information about the card holder along with a JPEG photo of the card holder, a JPEG photo with the card holder's signature, and another JPEG photo but with all 10 fingerprints of both hands of the card holder. Earlier cards used Code 16K and Code 49 barcodes with magnetic stripes.
|-
| 
| Computerised National Identity Card (CNIC)  and Smart National Identity Card (SNIC)| Computerized National Identity Card (CNIC) and SNIC issued by National Database and Registration Authority (NADRA). CNIC can be applied at the age of 18 and SNIC can be issued at age of 16 but not valid for voting or polling. SNIC complies with ICAO standard 9303 and ISO standard 7816-4 comes with English and Urdu both translations, integrated chip, QR code more personal data and more security features. National ID is not compulsory to carry all the time. But card is mandatory for voting, domestic flights, opening bank accounts, for passport, driving license, firearms license and almost all substantial monetary transactions from car, land to high-value assets and to enter sensitive areas in country (courts, military controlled areas, airports police stations and private residences). However law enforcement agencies can ask for CNIC during routine checking or after traffic violations. 
|-
| 
| بطاقة هوية (identity card)
| Identification Card. First made on the age of 16, The fields in it are identical to those in ID cards issued by Israeli civil administration prior to the Oslo accords, fields include Full name (four names), Mother name, date of birth, birthplace, Gender, Religion, place of issuance, and issue date. in addition to an appendix that includes address, marital status, name and ID number of and listing of partner, and previous name(s), in addition to a listing of children names. The document "validity" is incubated until the Israeli authorities approve it.
|-
| 
| National identity card
| E-National ID cards were rolled out in 2015.
|-
| 
| Cédula de identidad civil (Civil National Identity card)
| The Paraguayan national identity card is issued by the National Police and is compulsory for all citizens; with a cost of 8500 Paraguayan guaraní. 
|-
| 
| Documento Nacional de Identidad (National Identity Card)
| National Document of Identification or Documento Nacional de Identidad (DNI). Citizens can have a minor DNI but at the age of 17 they are encouraged to renew their DNI to get an Adult DNI. At 18, it is compulsory.
|-
| 
| Pambansang Pagkakakilanlan (Philippine Identification Card)
|  The Philippine Identification System (PhilSys) ID also known as the Philippine identity card is issued to all Filipino citizens and resident aliens in the Philippines. The pilot implementation began in selected regions in 2018 and full implementation began in 2019. The national ID card is not compulsory and will harmonize existing government-initiated identification cards issued including the Unified Multi-Purpose ID issued to members of the Social Security System, Government Service Insurance System, Philippine Health Insurance Corporation, and Home Development Mutual Fund (Pag-IBIG Fund). This will also replace the Alien Certificate of Registration (ACR) Card for foreign residents and expatriates who are living in the Philippines permanently.
|-
| 
| Dowód osobisty (Identity card)
| At 18, Polish citizens with their permanent residence in Poland must obtain Polish National Identity Card, however at 13 years of age some form of identification is required. The ID Card is issued free of charge. Those who do not comply with the relevant law are subject to restriction of freedom (community sentence) for up to one month or a fine. Pre-war Polish IDs were issued on-demand. Compulsory German ID cards (Kennkarte) were introduced during the Nazi-German occupation on 1939-10-26. Compulsory Polish IDs were introduced into Polish law in 1951. In many circumstances, a Polish passport may be used as an equivalent form of identification. Polish citizens without their permanent residence in Poland may obtain the card at any issuing office in Poland. Residents of Poland who are not Polish citizens may use Polish government issued residence card, instead. The oldest style of IDs, paper – similar to passports, is not valid since 2008-03-31. New style IDs issued after 2001 and before 2015 to people 65 years of age or older are valid indefinitely, otherwise the document is valid for ten years or five years (when issued under 18).
|-
| 
| Cartão de Cidadão (Citizen card)
|  the government has issued the Cartão do Cidadão (Citizen Card). The older Bilhete de identidade which has been compulsory at 10, is still in limited use. All citizens starting at the age of 6 are required to obtain an identity card, but are not required to carry them. According to other sources it is required to carry them.
|-
| 
| Qatari ID Card
|  the government has issued a Qatari ID Card to every Qatari citizen and resident over the age of 15. There are currently two types of cards in use, the smart card can be used to identify in government websites as well as for easier access to the country.
|-
| 
| Carte de identitate (identity card)
| The Carte de identitate is compulsory at 14.
|-
| 
| Internal passport of Russia
| A Russian identity document is issued to any citizen on request at the age of 14 and reissued at ages 20 and 45. People may use other documents for identity as well (e.g., driver's license, passport), but only in limited number of cases. Banks, post offices and authority offices require internal passport for identification.
|-
| 
| Rwandan National Identity Card 
| Compulsory for all Rwandan citizens living in the country, with a price of 500 RWF. Valid for international travel to Kenya and Uganda.
|-
| 
| National Identity Card
| Compulsory.
|-
| 
| San Marino identity card
| Compulsory for all Sanmarinese citizens. Biometric and valid for international travel since 2016.
|-
| 
| Bilhete de identidade (identity card)
| Compulsory. Issued since 2008.
|-
| 
| بطاقة الأحوال المدنية (Bitaqat Al-Ahwal Al-Madaniya, Iqama or Bataka)
| Compulsory for men 17 and older and optional for teenage men aged 15–16. Optional for women but issued to women 18 and older. Compulsory for Citizens, expatriates, and residents.
|-
| 
| Lična karta (Лична карта) (Identity card)
| Compulsory for citizens 16 and older permanently residing in Serbia, and compulsory for non-citizens residing in Serbia. Optional for minors 10–15. Must be carried whenever in public. Although the identity card is the most commonly used identification document, three others will suffice: a passport, driver's licence, or refugee ID card. Cards referring to the former states SFR Yugoslavia and FR Yugoslavia were eliminated by the end of 2016.
|-
| 
| Carte Nationale d'identité CEDEAO (CEDEAO National Identity card)
| Compulsory for all citizens. Biometric since 2017.
|-
| 
| National Identity card
| Compulsory for all Seychelles citizens, with a cost of SR50.
|-
| 
| Sierra Leone identity card
| Compulsory for citizens and permanent residents with a price of 10,000 SLL every 5 years.
|-
| 
| National Registration Identity Card
| Compulsory for citizens and permanent residents 15 and older and must be renewed upon turning 30 and upon turning 55 if born after January 1962. The NRIC does not need to be carried at all times, and it need not be produced to police officers who are merely screening passers-by while on patrol. But it is sometimes necessary to produce one's NRIC: for example, when renewing one's passport, voting, and applying for public services. Notably, the NRIC includes the bearer's race, among typical demographic information.
|-
| 
| Občiansky preukaz (citizen card)
| Compulsory for citizens 15 and older and is used to identify the bearer in daily interaction with authorities. The citizen card includes the bearer's photograph, birth date, address, and unique number.
|-
| 
| Osebna izkaznica (identity card)
| Compulsory for citizens 18 and older who have a permanent residence in Slovenia but who do not have a passport. Citizens younger than 18 may obtain an identity card with their legal ascendant(s) permission. It must be carried at all times.
|-
| 
| Warqadda Aqoonsiga (identity card)
|Compulsory for all Somali citizens. Electronic since 2014.
|-
| 
|South African identity card| Compulsory for citizens 16 and older, and compulsory for all non-citizen permanent residents. The older form of Identity Document, in the form of a green booklet, began being phased out in 2013. Although passports and driver's licences are also acceptable forms of identification, banks only accept a national identity card. Your ID has a barcode, a photo, and a unique number. Demographic information including age and gender − but not race – is included, as is the bearer's criminal record, voting history, licence to drive, right to possess a firearm, and the like. A national identity card is necessary to obtain a passport, bank account, and driver's licence, and is also necessary to register to vote. Employers will typically photocopy a visitor's identity card to process her appointment. Because it is frequently necessary to produce a national identity card, many South African permanent resident carry their card at all times.

As of January 2019, South Africans citizens born outside of South Africa, as well as permanent residents, still cannot apply for the new ID card, nor access the online services of Home Affairs.
|-
| 
| 주민등록증 (Identity card)
| Compulsory for citizens 17 and older. This card contains the citizen's unique resident registration number, which is required for government and private business, for example, opening bank accounts and creating online accounts with web sites and gaming networks.
All citizens must submit and save their 10 fingerprints to the criminal database operated by National Police Agency and right thumb fingerprint to Ministry of Interior and Safety at the time of ID card application.
|-
| 
| National ID
| Issued to every South Sudanese of at least eighteen years of age for purposes of employment or as required by a “competent authority.” South Sudan also issues a second similar document known as the 'Nationality Certificate'. This latest one is the document granted to a South Sudanese National who is eligible for national status in accordance with the provisions of Chapter III of the Nationality Act, 2011
|-
| 
| National identity card
| Compulsory for all Sudanese citizens.
|-
| 
| Identiteitskaart (national identity card)
| Compulsory for all Surinamese citizens.
|-
| 
| Documento Nacional de Identidad (DNI; National identification document)
| Compulsory for anyone 14 and older. Minors younger than 14 can obtain a DNI, for example, to travel to other European countries. It is routinely used for identification and is often necessary to conduct public and private business. Many companies and government offices photocopy a bearer's DNI. Beginning in 2006, the DNI has been replaced by the DNI electrónico (electronic DNI). Since 2015, the National identity card became fully biometric, releasing yet again, a new design. 
|-
| 
| National Identity Cardජාතික හැඳුනුම්පතதேசிய அடையாள அட்டை
| All citizens over the age of 16 need to apply for a National Identity Card (NIC). Each NIC has a unique 10 digit number, in the format 000000000A (where 0 is a digit and A is a letter). The first two digits of the number are your year of birth (e.g., 88xxxxxxxx for someone born in 1988). The final letter is generally a V or X. An NIC number is required to apply for a passport (over 16), driving license (over 18) and to vote (over 18). In addition, all citizens are required to carry their NIC on them at all times as proof of identity, given the security situation in the country. NICs are not issued to non-citizens, but they too are required to carry some form of photo identification (such as a photocopy of their passport or foreign driving license) at all times. In addition the Department of Post may issue an identity card with a validity of five years, this may be gained in lieu of an NIC if the latter is unable to be issued.

|-
| 
| National ID card
| Compulsory for all citizens of The Kingdom of Eswatini.
|-
| 
| بطاقة الهوية الوطنية (National ID card)
| Compulsory for all Syrian citizens. Must be uptained at the age of 14. Information displayed in Arabic only.
|-
| 
| National Identification Card
國民身份證
| Compulsory for ROC nationals 14 and older whose household is registered in Taiwan.
|-
| 
| Корти миллии миллӣ (national ID card)
| Compulsory for all Tajik citizens. Electronic, with informations displayed in both Tajik and English since 2015.
|-
| 
| บัตรประจำตัวประชาชน (Thai national ID card)
| Compulsory for citizens who are 7 – 70 years of age. People older than 70 years and exempted citizen can still apply for a card. A fee of ฿100 is payable in case of loss, damage or information alteration. 
|-
| 
| Bilhete de Identidade (Identity Card)
| Compulsory for all East Timorese citizens. Issued since 2018, with EU and Portuguese funds.
|-
| 
| بطاقة التعريف الوطنية (Tunisian National Identification Card)
| Compulsory for citizens 18 and older. A minor can obtain a national identity card with a legal ascendant(s) approval. 
|-
| 
| Kimlik Kartı (Identity card)
| Compulsory from birth and must be carried at all times. A photograph is optional until the bearer turns 15. It is often photocopied at government offices, banks, and the like.
|-
| 
| National Identity Card
| Compulsory for Ugandan citizens anywhere in the world, and compulsory for non-citizen permanent residents in Uganda. In April–August 2014 the government registered sixteen out of eighteen million citizens. In 2017 the government began a nationwide effort to register children. An identity card or identity number is required for all government services, including voting, as well as many private services—for example, opening bank accounts, buying insurance policies, transferring interests in real property.
|-
| 
| Паспорт громадянина України (Passport of Ukrainian citizen)
| Compulsory for citizens 14 and older. Before 2016, the national identity card was a blue soft paper booklet like the typical international passport. In 2016, the government began issuing credit-card-sized biometric identity cards (a/k/a "internal passport" or "passport card") containing an RFID chip. The bearer's address is not printed on the card but is instead coded on the chip and can be accessed by any NFC compatible device. The card is printed in Ukrainian and English except for patronymic information that is only printed in Ukrainian. Cards last ten years before expiring, except that minors' identity cards must be renewed upon turning 18.
|-
| 
| بطاقة الهوية الوطنية (National ID Card)
| Compulsory for citizens, expatriates and residents. This is also known as Emirates ID.
|-
| 
| Cédula de Identidad (Identity card)
| Compulsory for citizens and residents except infants younger than 45 days.
|-
|
| Shaxs Guvohnmasi (National identity card)
| National identity card have officially Uzbek passports internally in 2021.
|-
| 
| Cédula de Identidad (Identity card)
| Compulsory for anyone 10 and older, and it must be renewed every 10 years.
|-
| 
| Căn cước công dân (Citizen Identity Card)
| All citizens above 14 years old must possess a citizen identification card (latest version is an electronic ID card), provided by the local authority, and must be reissued when the citizens' years of age reach 25, 40 and 60. Formerly a people's ID document was used.
|-
| 
| National identity card (?)
| Existing for all Yemeni citizens unfortunately little to no information can be found regarding these national identity cards.
|-
| 
| National Registration Card
| Compulsory for citizens aged 16 and older. It is laminated and must be carried at all times. The national identity card for citizens is green having the last digit of 1, Blue in colour with 2 as the last digit for Commonwealth and Pink in colour with 3 as the last digit for other.
|-
| 
| National Registration Card
| Compulsory for citizens 16 and older. It is plastic and must be carried at all times.
|}

Countries with non-compulsory identity cards
These are countries where official authorities issue identity cards to those who request them, but where it is not illegal to be without an official identity document. For some services, identification is needed, but documents such as passports or identity cards issued by banks or driving licences can be used. In countries where national identity cards are fully voluntary, they are often not so commonly used, because many already have a passport and a driving licence, so a third identity document is often considered superfluous.

Countries with no identity cards
These are countries where official authorities do not issue any identity cards. When identification is needed, e.g. passports, identity cards issued by banks etc., or cards that are not mainly identity cards like driver's licenses can be used. Most countries that are not listed at all in this page have no national ID card.

See also
 Identity document
 Cédula de identidad
 National identity cards in the European Economic Area
 Stop and identify statutes
 Obligation of identification
 National biometric id card
 CCTV camera

Notes
 As noted above, certain countries do not have national ID cards, but have other official documents that play the same role in practice (e.g. driver's license for the United States). While a country may not make it de jure compulsory to own or carry an identity document, it may be de facto'' strongly recommended to do so in order to facilitate certain procedures.
 In most countries, non-resident foreign citizens have to be able to identify themselves through a passport. For residents with "foreign" characteristics (e.g. skin color, dialect) possession of an acceptable identity card might be useful to reduce the risk of harassment from the police and other authorities.
 In many countries, people suspected of crime will be detained until their identity is proven even in countries not requiring an identity card.

References

Identity documents by country
Lists by country